Börzsöny (New City Mountains) is a mountain range in Northern Hungary.

It is the westernmost member of the North Hungarian Mountains, which belongs to the Inner Western Carpathians. The varied landscape offers good hiking opportunities. A large part of the Börzsöny is national park. From the top of Csóványos we can see one of the country's most beautiful panorama on the Danube Bend (Dunakanyar).

Geography

The mountain is structurally divided into four parts: High Börzsöny, Northern Börzsöny, Western Börzsöny and Southern Börzsöny.

High Börzsöny 
Here are the highest peaks of Börzsöny: the Csóványos (938 m), Magos-fa (916 m), Nagy-hideg Hill (864 m) and Nagy-Inóc (826 m).

Northern Börzsöny

Western Börzsöny

Southern Börzsöny

Hydrography
There are about 470 creeks in Börzsöny.
The major parts of the creeks are clean water. 
The mountain's longest and largest river is the Kemence Stream.

Wildlife
A large part of the Börzsöny is covered with oak and beech. 
The mountains are still registered 16 species of mammals. 
The 117 species of birds occur each year in the mountains, of whom 90 are regularly spend. 
Best-known songbirds are the nightingale, the thrush and the skylark. 
Among the amphibians the most spectacular is the spotted salamander;  among the reptiles is the angry snake.

Gallery

See also
 Geography of Hungary
 North Hungarian Mountains
 Countrywide Blue Tour in Hungary

Extinct volcanoes
Mountain ranges of Hungary
Mountain ranges of the Western Carpathians
Volcanoes of Hungary